Sudesh Sharma is an Indian politician and a member of the 16th Legislative Assembly of Uttar Pradesh of India. He represents the Modinagar constituency of Uttar Pradesh and is a member of the Bhartiya janta party political party.

Early life and education
Sudesh Sharma was born in Ghaziabad. He received a Diploma in Civil Engineering (alma mater not known).

Political career
Sudesh Sharma has been a MLA for one term. He represented the Modinagar constituency and is a member of the Rashtriya Lok Dal political party.

Posts held

See also
Modinagar
Sixteenth Legislative Assembly of Uttar Pradesh
Uttar Pradesh Legislative Assembly

References 

Rashtriya Lok Dal politicians
Uttar Pradesh MLAs 2012–2017
People from Modinagar
1965 births
Living people